Whetstone is a census-designated place (CDP) in Cochise County, Arizona, United States, north of Sierra Vista.  The population was 2,617 at the 2010 census.

History
Whetstone was often referred to as the "Y" because the intersection of State routes 82 and 90 had an eastbound lane on 90 and a southbound lane on 82 that created a Y at the intersection.  Highway 90 ended one to two miles further north and people traveling north had to go via highway 82 east or west and then north on either highway 83 or highway 80.

Geography
Whetstone is located at  (31.703917, -110.347996).

Demographics

As of the census of 2000, there were 2,354 people, 904 households, and 664 families residing in the CDP. The racial makeup of the CDP was 84.0% White, 2.9% Black or African American, 1.2% Native American, 0.9% Asian, 6.5% from other races, and 4.5% from two or more races.  13.8% of the population were Hispanic or Latino of any race.

There were 904 households, out of which 32.7% had children under the age of 18 living with them, 57.2% were married couples living together, 10.7% had a female householder with no husband present, and 26.5% were non-families. 20.7% of all households were made up of individuals, and 6.9% had someone living alone who was 65 years of age or older.  The average household size was 2.60 and the average family size was 3.02.

In the CDP, the age distribution of the population shows 27.4% under the age of 18, 5.6% from 18 to 24, 25.3% from 25 to 44, 28.0% from 45 to 64, and 13.7% who were 65 years of age or older.  The median age was 40 years. For every 100 females, there were 97.3 males.  For every 100 females age 18 and over, there were 95.0 males.

The median income for a household in the CDP was $34,507, and the median income for a family was $37,656. Males had a median income of $32,083 versus $25,424 for females. The per capita income for the CDP was $16,370.  About 13.4% of families and 20.0% of the population were below the poverty line, including 32.3% of those under age 18 and 1.3% of those age 65 or over.

References

Census-designated places in Cochise County, Arizona
Census-designated places in Arizona